Gulbarga Dakshin Assembly constituency is one of the seats in Karnataka state assembly in India, since 2008. It is part of Gulbarga Lok Sabha seat.

Members of Assembly 
 2008: Chandrashekhar Patil Revoor, Bharatiya Janata Party
 2010 (By-Poll): Aruna Chandrashekhar Patil Revoor, Janata Dal (Secular)
 2013: Dattatraya Patil Revoor, Bharatiya Janata Party
 2018: Dattatraya Patil Revoor, Bharatiya Janata Party

See also 
 List of constituencies of Karnataka Legislative Assembly

References 

Assembly constituencies of Karnataka